The Waco S Series is a family of American cabin biplanes produced by the Waco Aircraft Company starting in 1935.

Development and designations

The Waco closed cabin biplanes, initially known as the C (for Cabin) series were all unequal span, staggered single bay biplanes.  They were fabric covered, the wings having a wooden structure and the control surfaces and fuselage constructed from metal frames. The wings were braced with outward splayed N form interplane struts plus a strut connecting the centre section rear spar to the bottom of the forward interplane strut, following Waco's standard practice.  They had a fixed tailwheel undercarriage, which could be partially or completely faired.  There was seating for 4/5 including the pilot.  Most were powered by 7 cylinder radial engines of different makes.

When Waco released its slightly larger custom cabin series, those original Cabin series aircraft it continued to produce were redesignated as 'Waco Standard Cabin series', with the final designation letter changing from C to C-S to S. For instance in 1935 the YKC became the YKC-S, then the YKS-6 in 1936. All three were indistinguishable from each other. Waco used numeric suffixes like -7 to indicate a subvariant introduced in 1937 and so on. The standard cabin can be subdivided again into three groups, early examples having a boat-tail skylight (QDC, OEC & UEC), mid series aircraft with a faired skylight (CJC, UIC, UKC, YKC) or late examples with no skylight (DJC-S, HKS, ZKS, UKC-S UKS-7, VKS-7, YKC-S, YKS-6 & 7, ZKS-6 & 7). All of the types built under the C-S and S designators lacked a skylight though the skylight could be faired over on earlier aircraft. Later types were also slightly longer than earlier models.

From about 1937, all S series aircraft had wings lacking leading and trailing edge cutouts. Externally, the S series differed from the Custom or later C series in continuing with early C series features such as ailerons on both wings, linked by a prominent strut, and square edged rear side windows.  Like most Waco aircraft, the S series were available with many different engines (identified by the first letter of the type designation).

Operational history

The S series proved to be popular with both commercial and private pilots and over 50 were still airworthy in 2001, including examples of the CPTP VKS-7F version.  During the Second World War several S series aircraft were impressed by the USAAF as the UC-72K or UC-72M and used as Liaison, executive light transport and instrument refresher training aircraft. Only a handful remain airworthy in this century.

Variants
(per Simpson, 2001, p. 575 and Green, 1965, p. 307)

DKS-6 
HKS-7   Lycoming R-680-13
UKS-6   Continental W-670-K
UKS-7   Continental W-670-K
VKS-7   Continental W-670-M  The -7F model was used in the CPTP program, F indicating that flaps were fitted.
VKS-7F   Continental W-670-M  The -7F model was used in the CPTP program, F indicating that flaps were fitted.

YKS-6   Jacobs L-4
YKS-7   Jacobs L-4

ZKS-6   Jacobs L-5
ZKS-7   Jacobs L-4 or  Jacobs L-5
HKS-7   Lycoming R-680-13

Specifications (VKS-7F)

References

Notes

Bibliography

External links

 Technical and model data on Waco aircraft

1930s United States civil utility aircraft
S series
Biplanes
Single-engined tractor aircraft
Aircraft first flown in 1935